Vétheuil is a commune on the Seine, 60 kilometers northwest of Paris, France. Vétheuil is located in the arrondissement of Pontoise in the Val-d'Oise department.

Personalities
Impressionist painter Claude Monet lived in Vétheuil from 1878 to 1881, during which time he produced some 150 paintings. Joan Mitchell moved to Vetheuil in 1959 where she productively made many abstract works.

Camille Doncieux (1847-1879) was the first wife of Claude Monet, who painted her portrait in 1886. Before marrying Monet she was his model, and appeared three times in the painting Women in the Garden (Femmes au jardin). She died in Vétheuil, where she and her husband lived since 1878, and her grave is in Vétheuil cemetery.

See also
Communes of the Val-d'Oise department

References

External links
Official website 

Association of Mayors of the Val d'Oise 

Communes of Val-d'Oise